The Electromagnetic Aircraft Launch System (EMALS) is a type of aircraft launching system developed by General Atomics for the United States Navy. The system launches carrier-based aircraft by means of a catapult employing a linear induction motor rather than the conventional steam piston.

Its main advantage is that it accelerates aircraft more smoothly, putting less stress on their airframes. Compared to steam catapults, the EMALS also weighs less, is expected to cost less and require less maintenance, and can launch both heavier and lighter aircraft than a steam piston-driven system. It also reduces the carrier's requirement of fresh water, thus reducing the demand for energy-intensive desalination.

Design and development
Developed in the 1950s, steam catapults have proven exceptionally reliable. Carriers equipped with four steam catapults have been able to use at least one of them 99.5% of the time. However, there are a number of drawbacks. One group of Navy engineers wrote: "The foremost deficiency is that the catapult operates without feedback control. With no feedback, there often occurs large transients in tow force that can damage or reduce the life of the airframe." The steam system is massive, inefficient (4–6% useful work), and hard to control. These control problems allow  steam-powered catapults to launch heavy aircraft, but not aircraft as light as many unmanned aerial vehicles.

A system somewhat similar to EMALS, Westinghouse's electropult, was developed in 1946 but not deployed.

Linear induction motor
The EMALS uses a linear induction motor (LIM), which uses alternating current (AC) to generate magnetic fields that propel a carriage along a track to launch the aircraft. The EMALS consists of four main elements: The linear induction motor consists of a row of stator coils with the same function as the circular stator coils in a conventional induction motor. When energized, the motor accelerates the carriage along the track. Only the section of the coils surrounding the carriage is energized at any given time, thereby minimizing reactive losses.

Energy-storage subsystem
During a launch, the induction motor requires a large surge of electric power that exceeds what the ship's own continuous power source can provide. The EMALS energy-storage system design accommodates this by drawing power from the ship during its 45-second recharge period and storing the energy kinetically using the rotors of four disk alternators; the system then releases that energy (up to 484 MJ) in 2–3 seconds. A maximum-performance launch using 121 MJ of energy from each disk alternator slows the rotors from 6400 rpm to 5205 rpm.

Power-conversion subsystem
During the launch, the power-conversion subsystem releases the stored energy from the disk alternators using a cycloconverter. The cycloconverter provides a controlled rising frequency and voltage to the LIM, energizing only the small portion of stator coils that affect the launch carriage at any given moment.

Control consoles
Operators control the power through a closed-loop system. Hall-effect sensors on the track monitor its operation, allowing the system to ensure that it provides the desired acceleration. The closed-loop system allows the EMALS to maintain a constant tow force, which helps reduce launch stresses on the plane's airframe.

Program status

Aircraft Compatibility Testing (ACT) Phase 1 concluded in late 2011 following 134 launches (aircraft types comprising the F/A-18E Super Hornet, T-45C Goshawk, C-2A Greyhound, E-2D Advanced Hawkeye, and F-35C Lightning II) using the EMALS demonstrator installed at Naval Air Engineering Station Lakehurst.

 1–2 June 2010: Successful launch of a McDonnell Douglas T-45 Goshawk.
 9–10 June 2010: Successful launch of a Grumman C-2 Greyhound.
 18 December 2010: Successful launch of a Boeing F/A-18E Super Hornet.
 27 September 2011: Successful launch of a Northrop Grumman E-2D Advanced Hawkeye.
 18 November 2011: Successful launch of a Lockheed Martin F-35 Lightning II.

ACT Phase 2 began on 25 June 2013 and concluded on 6 April 2014 after a further 310 launches (including launches of the Boeing EA-18G Growler and McDonnell Douglas F/A-18C Hornet, as well as another round of testing with aircraft types previously launched during Phase 1). In Phase 2, various carrier situations were simulated, including off-center launches and planned system faults, to demonstrate that aircraft could meet end-speed and validate launch-critical reliability.

 June 2014: The Navy completed EMALS prototype testing of 450 manned aircraft launches involving every fixed-wing carrier-borne aircraft type in the USN inventory at Joint Base McGuire–Dix–Lakehurst during two Aircraft Compatibility Testing (ACT) campaigns.
 May 2015: First full-speed shipboard tests conducted.

Delivery and deployment
On 28 July 2017, Lt. Cmdr. Jamie "Coach" Struck of Air Test and Evaluation Squadron 23 (VX-23) performed the first EMALS catapult launch from USS Gerald R. Ford (CVN-78) in an F/A-18F Super Hornet.

By April 2021, 8,000 launch/recovery cycles had been performed with the EMALS and the AAG arrestor system aboard USS Gerald R. Ford. The USN also stated that the great majority of these cycles had occurred in the prior 18 months and that 351 pilots had completed training on the EMALS/AAG.

Advantages
Compared to steam catapults, EMALS weighs less, occupies less space, requires less maintenance and manpower, is more reliable, recharges quicker, and uses less energy. EMALS uses no steam, which makes it suitable for the US Navy's planned all-electric ships.

Compared to steam catapults, EMALS can control the launch performance with greater precision, allowing it to launch more kinds of aircraft, from heavy fighter jets to light unmanned aircraft. With up to 121 megajoules available, each one of the four disk alternators in the EMALS system can deliver 29% more energy than a steam catapult's approximately 95 MJ. The EMALS, with their planned 90% power conversion efficiency, will also be more efficient than steam catapults, which achieve only a 5% efficiency.

Criticisms 
In May 2017, President Donald Trump criticized EMALS during an interview with Time, saying that in comparison to traditional steam catapults, "the digital costs hundreds of millions of dollars more money and it's no good".

President Trump's criticism was echoed by a highly critical 2018 report from the Pentagon, which emphasized that reliability of EMALS leaves much to be desired and that the average rate of critical failures is nine times higher than the Navy's threshold requirements.

Reliability 
In 2013, at the Lakehurst, New Jersey test site, 201 of 1,967 test launches failed, giving a 10% failure rate for the test series. . Factoring in the then-current state of the system, the most generous numbers available in 2013 showed that EMALS has an average "time between failure" rate of 1 in 240.
 	
According to a March 2015 report, "Based on expected reliability growth, the failure rate for the last reported Mean Cycles Between Critical Failure was five times higher than should have been expected. As of August 2014, the Navy has reported that over 3,017 launches have been conducted at the Lakehurst test site, but have not provided DOT&E [Director, Operational Test and Evaluation] with an update of failures."
 	
In the test configuration, EMALS could not launch fighter aircraft with external drop tanks mounted. "The Navy has developed fixes to correct these problems, but testing with manned aircraft to verify the fixes has been postponed to 2017".

In July 2017 the system was successfully tested at sea on the USS Gerald R. Ford.

A January 2021 DOT&E Report stated: "During the 3,975 catapult launches [...] EMALS demonstrated an achieved reliability of 181 mean cycles between operational mission failure (MCBOMF) [...] This reliability is well below the requirement of 4,166 MCBOMF." EMALS breaks down often and is not reliable, the Pentagon's director of testing Robert Behler reported after assessing 3,975 cycles on the USS Gerald R. Ford from November 2019 through September 2020.

In April 2022, Rear Adm. Shane G. Gahagan at Naval Air Systems Command said that, despite reports to the contrary, the system is working fine and has achieved 8,500 "cats and traps" on the USS Gerald R. Ford over the past two years.

On 25 June 2022, the major milestone of 10,000 successful catapult launches and arrested landings aboard USS Gerald R. Ford was achieved.

A June 2022 GAO report states "The Navy also continues to struggle with the reliability
of the electromagnetic aircraft launch system and
advanced arresting gear needed to meet requirements
to rapidly deploy aircraft." The report also indicates the Navy doesn't expect EMALS and AAG to reach reliability goals until the "2030's"

Other users of the General Atomics system

France
The French Navy is actively planning for a future aircraft carrier and new flagship. The ship will be nuclear-powered and feature the EMALS catapult system. Construction of the PANG is expected to begin around 2025 and will enter service in 2038, the year the aircraft carrier  is due to be retired.

India
The Indian Navy has shown an interest in installing the EMALS system for its planned CATOBAR INS Vishal aircraft carrier. The Indian government has shown interest in producing the Electromagnetic Aircraft Launch System locally with the assistance of General Atomics.

United Kingdom
In August 2009, speculation mounted that the UK may drop the STOVL F-35B for the CTOL F-35C model, which would have meant the carriers being built to operate conventional takeoff and landing aircraft using the UK-designed non-steam EMCAT catapults.

In October 2010, the UK Government announced it would buy the F-35C, using a then-undecided CATOBAR system. A contract was signed in December 2011 with General Atomics of San Diego to develop EMALS for the Queen Elizabeth-class carriers. However, in May 2012, the UK Government reversed its decision after the projected costs rose to double the original estimate and delivery moved back to 2023, cancelling the F-35C option and reverting to its original decision to buy the STOVL F-35B.

See also
Advanced Arresting Gear
Coilgun
Railgun
Mass driver
Modern United States Navy carrier air operations
Naval aviation

References

External links

"Electromagnetic Aircraft Launch System – EMALS", GlobalSecurity.org
"Electropult"
The electromagnetic rail aircraft launch system, Pt 1: Objectives and principles EEWorldonline.com
The electromagnetic rail aircraft launch system, Pt 2: Implementation and issues EEWorldonline.com

Aircraft carriers
Electromagnetic components
Linear induction motors
Naval aviation technology